Nidorellia armata, also known as the  chocolate chip star (leading to easy confusion with Protoreaster nodosus), is a species of starfish from warmer parts of the East Pacific, where it ranges from the Gulf of California to northwest Peru, including the Galápagos. It is the only species in the genus Nidorellia. N. armata can be found in tropical waters clinging on corals and rocky reefs; and are sometimes kept as pets in home marine aquariums.

References

External links
 Nidorellia armata picture
 

Oreasteridae
Monotypic echinoderm genera
Taxa named by John Edward Gray